Events in the year 1974 in Turkey.

Parliament
 15th Parliament of Turkey

Incumbents
President – Fahri Korutürk
Prime Minister 
Naim Talu (to 26 January 1974)
Bülent Ecevit (26 January–17 November 1974)
Sadi Irmak (from 17 November 1974)
Leader of the opposition – Süleyman Demirel (26 January–17 November 1974)

Ruling party and the main opposition
Ruling party: Republican People's Party (CHP); coalition partner National Salvation Party (MSP) (26 January–17 November 1974)
Main opposition: Justice Party (AP) (26 January–17 November 1974)

Cabinet
36th government of Turkey (to 26 January 1974)  
37th government of Turkey (16 January–17 November 1974)
38th government of Turkey (from 17 November 1974)

Events
 26 January – Turkish Airlines Flight 301 crashes
 3 March – Turkish Airlines Flight 981 crashes near Paris with 346 fatalities.
 10 March – Gürdal Duyars sculpture Güzel İstanbul is erected on Karaköy Square.
 18 March – Gürdal Duyars sculpture Güzel İstanbul is removed from Karaköy Square.
 26 May – Fenerbahçe wins the championship.
 22 June – Socialist Labor Party of Turkey formed.
 15 July – 1974 Cypriot coup d'état.
 20 July – Turkish Armed Forces invade Cyprus.
 31 July – Ceasefire on Cyprus.
 14 August – Turkish military activities resume on Cyprus as Geneva peace talks fail.
 9 September – Keban Dam becomes operational.

Births
17 May – Şebnem Dönmez, actress and TV program presenter
31 May – Kenan Doğulu, singer
27 August – Hakan Haslaman, stuntman, and also director and film producer
1 October – Hasan Özer, footballer
12 October – Ebru Gündeş, singer

Deaths
25 May – Ulvi Uraz theatre director
22 July – Orhan Brandt, philatelist 
26 October – Fahrettin Altay, former general
14 December – Yakup Kadri Karaosmanoğlu, novelist

Gallery

See also
 1973–74 1.Lig
 List of Turkish films of 1974

References

 
Years of the 20th century in Turkey